Krasnoye is a rural locality (a selo) in Assokolayskoye Rural Settlement of Teuchezhsky District, the Republic of Adygea, Russia. The population was 299 in 2018. There are eight streets.

Geography 
Krasnoye is located 7 km east of Ponezhukay (the district's administrative centre) by road. Assokolay is the nearest rural locality.

References 

Rural localities in Teuchezhsky District